The 2015 BMW Open was a men's tennis tournament played on outdoor clay courts. It was the 100th edition of the event, and part of the ATP World Tour 250 series of the 2015 ATP World Tour. It took place at the MTTC Iphitos complex in Munich, Germany, from 25 April through 3 May 2015. First-seeded Andy Murray won the singles title.

Singles main draw entrants

Seeds

 Rankings are as of April 20, 2015.

Other entrants
The following players received wildcards into the main draw:
  Florian Mayer
  Janko Tipsarević
  Alexander Zverev

The following players received entry from the qualifying draw:
  Dustin Brown
  Gerald Melzer
  Radek Štěpánek
  Mischa Zverev

The following players received entry as lucky losers:
  Mikhail Ledovskikh
  Bastian Trinker

Withdrawals
Before the tournament
  Julien Benneteau →replaced by Jan-Lennard Struff
  Ivo Karlović →replaced by Farrukh Dustov
  Martin Kližan →replaced by Bastian Trinker
  Gaël Monfils →replaced by Mikhail Ledovskikh
  Andreas Seppi →replaced by Vasek Pospisil

Retirements
  Pablo Andújar
  Farrukh Dustov

Doubles main draw entrants

Seeds

 Rankings are as of April 20, 2015.

Other entrants
The following pairs received wildcards into the doubles main draw:
  Florian Mayer /  Frank Moser 
  Alexander Zverev /  Mischa Zverev

Champions

Singles

  Andy Murray defeated  Philipp Kohlschreiber, 7–6(7–4), 5–7, 7–6(7–4)

Doubles

  Alexander Peya /  'Bruno Soares defeated  Alexander Zverev /  Mischa Zverev, 4–6, 6–1, [10–5]

References

External links
Official website

 
]